Alex Redolfi (born 20 January 1994) is an Italian footballer who plays as a defender for  club Gubbio.

Club career

Atalanta 
Born in Calcinate, Redolfi was a youth exponent of Atalanta.

Loan to Como 
On 11 July 2013, Redolfi was signed by Serie C side Como on a season-long loan deal. On 1 September e made his Serie C debut for Como, as a starter, in a 1–0 away defeat against Virtus Entella, he played the entire match. On 1 December he scored his first professional goal in Serie C in the 37th minute of a 2–0 home win over Venezia. On 11 May 2014 he was sent off with a double yellow card in the 112th minute of a match lost 4–3 at penalty after a 0–0 away draw against Südtirol in the quarter-finals of the Serie C playoffs. Redolfi ended his season-long loan to Como with 20 appearances and 1 goal.

Loan to Pontedera 
On 8 July 2014, Redolfi was signed by Serie C side Pontedera on a season-long loan deal. On 10 August he made his debut for Pontedera, he was replaced by Andrea Gasbarro in the 60th minute of a 3–1 home win over Messina in the first round of Coppa Italia. On 8 September, Redolfo made his Serie C debut for Pontedera as a substitute replacing Filippo Scardina in the 82nd minute of a 2–1 home win over San Marino Calcio. On 20 September he played his first entire match for Pontedera, a 1–0 away defeat against Lucchese. Redolfi ended his loan to Pontedera with 35 appearances, including 30 as a starter, and 2 assists.

Loan to Pro Vercelli 
On 10 July 2015, Redolfi signed a season-long loan deal with Serie B side Pro Vercelli. On 9 August he made his debut for Pro Vercelli, as a starter, in a 2–1 home defeat against Alessandria in the second round of Coppa Italia, he played the entire match. On 6 September, Redolfi made his Serie B debut for Pro Vercelli as a substitute replacing Mattia Bani in the 82nd minute of a 2–1 home win over Virtus Lanciano. On 2 April 2016 he played his first entire match in Serie B, a 1–1 home draw against Modena. Redolfi ended his season-long loan to Pro Vercelli with only 5 appearances, 2 as a starter and 3 as a substitute.

Loan to Olhanense and Cremonese 
On 1 July 2016, Redolfi was signed by LigaPro side Olhanense on a season-long loan deal. On 31 July he made his debut for Olhanense in a 2–1 home defeat against Varzim in the first round of Taça da Liga, he was replaced by Carlos Freitas in the 74th minute. On 6 August, Redolfi made his LigaPro debut in a 2–1 home defeat against Académica, he played the entire match. On 7 January Redolfi, as a substitute, made an own goal in the 69th minute of a 4–0 away defeat against Penafiel. In January 2017, Redolfi was re-called to Atalanta leaving Olhanense with 16 appearances.

On 18 January 2017, Redolfi was signed by Serie C side Cremonese on a 6-month loan deal. On 22 January he made his debut in Serie C for Cremonese, as a starter, in a 1–1 home draw against Pro Piacenza, he was replaced by Alessandro Bastrini in the 37th minute. On 5 February, Redolfi played his first complete match for Cremonese, a 3–3 home draw against Carrarese. Redolfi ended his loan to Cremonese with 7 appearances but Cremonese won the Serie C title.

Loan to Juve Stabia 
On 13 July 2017, Resolfi was signed by Serie C side Juve Stabia on a season-long loan deal. On 30 July he made his debut for Juve Stabia in a 3–1 home win over Bassano Virtus in the first round of Coppa Italia, he played the entire match. On 26 August, Redolfi made his Serie C debut for Juve Stabia in a 3–3 away draw against Fidelis Andria, he was replaced by Zhivko Atanasov in the 75th minute. On 9 September he played his first complete match in Serie C for Juve Stabia, a 0–0 away draw against Catanzaro. On 3 October, Radolfi scored an own goal in the 45th minute and he was sent off with a double yellow card 81st minute of a 1–0 away defeat against Bisceglie. Redolfi ended his loan to Juve Stabia with 17 appearances.

Reggina 
On 25 July 2018, Redolfi was signed by Serie C club Reggina on an undisclosed fee and a 2-year contract. On 18 September, Redolfi made his debut for Reggina in a 3–0 away defeat against Trapani, he was replaced by Cesare Pogliano in the 88th minute. On 2 December he played his first entire match for Reggina, a 3–2 home win over Rieti. On 30 December he scored his first goal for the club in the 7th minute of a 1–1 home draw against Trapani. Redolfi ended his first season at Reggina with 13 appearances and 1 goal.

Vibonese 
On 10 August 2019, Redolfi joined to Serie C club Vibonese on an undisclosed fee and a 1-year contract with the option for the second year. Two weeks later, on 25 August, Redolfi made his league debut for Vibonese in a 1–0 away defeat against Monopoli, he played the entire match. On 23 February 2020 he scored his first goal for the club in the 64th minute of a 2–1 away win over Casertana.

Gubbio 
On 19 July 2021, he moved to Gubbio.

International career 
Redolfi represented Italy only at Under-18 level and he collected a total of 2 caps. On 20 October 2011, Radolfi made his debut in the Italy U-18, in an international friendly, as a substitute replacing Daniele Rugani in the 46th minute of a 3–0 home defeat against Ukraine U-18. On 9 November, Radolfi made his second appearance for Italy U-18 as a starter in a 2–1 away defeat Germany U-18, he was replaced by Federico Maccarone in the 66th minute.

Career statistics

Club

Honours

Club 
Cremonese
 Serie C (Group A): 2016–17

References

External links
 

1994 births
Living people
People from Calcinate
Sportspeople from the Province of Bergamo
Footballers from Lombardy
Italian footballers
Association football defenders
Serie B players
Serie C players
Atalanta B.C. players
Como 1907 players
U.S. Città di Pontedera players
F.C. Pro Vercelli 1892 players
U.S. Cremonese players
S.S. Juve Stabia players
Reggina 1914 players
U.S. Vibonese Calcio players
A.S. Gubbio 1910 players
Liga Portugal 2 players
S.C. Olhanense players
Italian expatriate footballers
Italian expatriate sportspeople in Portugal
Expatriate footballers in Portugal
Italy youth international footballers